The Young Southeast Asian Leaders Initiative, also known as YSEALI (pronounced ), is a highly-competitive cultural exchange program for Southeast Asian emerging leaders sponsored by the U.S. Bureau of Education and Cultural Affairs. YSEALI programs are known to have 1-2% acceptance rates and are usually awarded to emerging leaders with outstanding work and potentials in their chosen fields or advocacies.

The initiative was launched by President Barack Obama in Manila in December 2013 as a way to strengthen leadership development, networking, and cultural exchange among emerging leaders within the age range of 18 to 35 years old from the 10 member-states of the Association of Southeast Asian Nations and Timor Leste. YSEALI's programs include prestigious exchange fellowship programs to the United States, professional short courses and diplomas, virtual and on-ground workshops within Southeast Asia, and seed grant funding opportunities. 

The programs fall under the key core themes of civic engagement, sustainable development, economic development, governance, and the environment. 

Alumni of YSEALI programs later assume key positions in government, civil societies, and corporations after their programs. Notable alumni of YSEALI include Vico Sotto, Syed Saddiq, Carrie Tan, and Lee Chean Chung. As of September 2020, the program has more than 5,000 alumni and 150,000 members across member countries.

In 2021, Texas representative Joaquin Castro filed a bill in the US House of Representatives to strengthen YSEALI as a law.

YSEALI Academic Fellowships 

The YSEALI Academic Fellowship Program which brings the participating delegation from each Southeast Asian country to study in an academic institution in the United States for six weeks to learn about their chosen advocacy, comparable to the Young African Leaders Initiative's Mandela Washington Fellowship program.

Institutions that have hosted the Academic Fellowship Program are the following:
 Arizona State University
 Brown University
 East-West Center
 Kennesaw State University
 Northern Illinois University
 Temple University
 University of Connecticut
 University of Montana
 University of Massachusetts Amherst
 University of Nebraska Omaha
University of Texas at Austin

YSEALI Seeds for the Future 

The YSEALI Seeds for the Future is a small grants competition for youth-led innovative projects in Southeast Asia established by the U.S. Mission to ASEAN, as implemented by Cultural Vistas. Since its establishment in 2017, the YSEALI Seeds for the Future has provided funding to 100 youth-led projects within the ASEAN region and Timor Leste funding at most US$15,000 for each successful winner.

2021 Grantees 
 Accessed Educators
 ActivateGov
 Bebas Sampah ID
 Dayadik
 #DisasterBusters
 #FEMNIMITR
 Hub R Sar
 InPsychOut
 Kilang ReRoot
 LEAPS
 PantiCT
 Pongo Academy
 Project Kayamanan
 Project TURO
 Purrfect Writers Club
 Real Money Real Youth
 Right Thing to SEA
 SMAYL
 Sokola Tengger
 Technify
 The Green Dots
 TrailX: #LifeGoals
 Project YEA
 WEGO
 Youth in Action for Youth Budget
 Yowana Subak

Notable alumni

Philippines 

 Vico Sotto
 Joyce Pring

Singapore 

 Carrie Tan (YSEALI Professional Fellowship, 2015)

Thailand

References 

2013 establishments in the United States

External links 

 Bureau of Educational and Cultural Affairs